The 1965 World Judo Championships were the 4th edition of the Men's World Judo Championships, and were held in Rio de Janeiro, Brazil from October 14–17, 1965.

Medal overview

Men

Medal table

References

External links
 results on judoinside.com retrieved December 12, 2013

World Championships
Judo competitions in Brazil
J
World Judo Championships
J